Khorramabad (also Romanized as Khorramābād and Khurramabad) is a village in Khorramabad Rural District, Esfarvarin District, Takestan County, Qazvin Province, Iran. At the 2006 census, its population was 1,680, in 415 families.

References 

Populated places in Takestan County